Strange Beautiful Music is the ninth studio album by guitarist Joe Satriani, released on June 25, 2002 through Epic Records; a Super Audio CD edition was released on September 10. The album reached No. 140 on the United States Billboard 200 and remained on that chart for a week, as well as reaching the top 100 in four other countries.

"Starry Night" was released as a single on June 10 and received a nomination for Best Rock Instrumental Performance at the 2003 Grammy Awards, Satriani's twelfth such nomination.

The title Strange Beautiful Music is also the name of Satriani's publishing company, as well as a lyric from "Third Stone from the Sun", a song by Jimi Hendrix, whom Satriani has cited as his main inspiration to start playing the guitar in his youth.

Release and tour
Recording for Strange Beautiful Music began in January 2002 and the title was announced on March 25. Worldwide touring began in Europe in July, followed by North America from August to September, East Asia in October, additional dates in North America from November through to February 2003, Central America in March, and concluding in South America in April.

Track listing

Personnel

Joe Satriani – guitar, banjo, keyboard (tracks 11, 14), sitar, autoharp (track 2), bass, engineering, mixing, production
Robert Fripp – Frippertronics (track 6)
Eric Caudieux – keyboard (track 4), digital editing, production
Jeff Campitelli – drums, percussion (track 14)
Gregg Bissonette – drums (track 2)
John Cuniberti – percussion (tracks 1, 2, 5, 10, 11), engineering, mixing, production
Matt Bissonette – bass
Pia Vai – harp (track 4)
Justin Phelps – engineering assistance, digital editing
Bernie Grundman – mastering

Chart performance

Awards

References

External links
In Review: Joe Satriani "Strange Beautiful Music" at Guitar Nine Records
Interview: Joe Satriani at AskMen

Joe Satriani albums
2002 albums
Epic Records albums
Grammy Award for Best Rock Instrumental Performance